Walt Disney World Co. v. Wood,  (Fla. Dist. Ct. App. 1986) is a court decision by Florida's Fourth District Court of Appeal illustrating the principle of joint and several liability when combined with comparative negligence.  It also features a unique twist in that the plaintiff and one of the defendants were (at the time of the incident giving rise to the suit) engaged, and later married.

In 1971, Aloysia Wood was injured on the Grand Prix bumper-car ride at Walt Disney World when her then-fiance, Daniel Wood, rammed his car into the rear of hers.

The jury assessed her damages at $75,000.

The jury then returned a verdict finding Aloysia Wood 14% at fault, Daniel Wood 85% at fault, and Disney 1% at fault.   The court (under the doctrine of joint and several liability) then ordered Disney to pay 86% of the damages - its 1% percentage plus Daniel Woods' 85% percentage - because Daniel (who was by then Aloysia's husband) was unable to pay his portion.

This case is sometimes cited in calls for tort reform.

References

United States tort case law
Florida state case law
1986 in United States case law
1986 in Florida
Walt Disney World
Disney litigation
Law articles needing an infobox